Bruno Sávio da Silva (born 1 August 1994), known as Bruno Sávio, is a Brazilian footballer who plays as a forward for Egyptian Premier League side Al Ahly.

Club career
Born in Pará de Minas, Minas Gerais, Bruno Sávio joined América Mineiro's youth setup in 2013, after a trial period. On 5 August 2014, after impressing with the under-20s, he renewed his contract until 2017.

Bruno Sávio made his senior debut on 1 February 2015, coming on as a second-half substitute in a 0–0 Campeonato Mineiro away draw against Guarani. He made his Série B debut on 9 May, starting in a 1–1 home draw against Bahia.

Bruno Sávio scored his first professional goal on 3 October 2015, netting a last minute winner in a 2–1 success at Mogi Mirim.

In January 2022, he joined Bolívar and in his debut game against Blooming on 6 February 2022, he scored a hat-trick. 

In September 2022, he transferred to Egyptian club Al Ahly. On 28 October 2022, he scored his first goal for Al Ahly in a 2–0 win against Zamalek in the 2021–22 Egyptian Super Cup. Hence, he won his first title ever in his career.

Honours
Al Ahly
 Egyptian Super Cup: 2021–22

References

External links

1994 births
Living people
Sportspeople from Minas Gerais
Brazilian footballers
Association football forwards
Campeonato Brasileiro Série A players
Campeonato Brasileiro Série B players
Campeonato Brasileiro Série C players
Croatian Football League players
Egyptian Premier League players
América Futebol Clube (MG) players
Mirassol Futebol Clube players
Cuiabá Esporte Clube players
Clube Atlético Bragantino players
Avaí FC players
NK Istra 1961 players
Guarani FC players
Club Bolívar players
Al Ahly SC players
Brazilian expatriate footballers
Expatriate footballers in Croatia
Expatriate footballers in Egypt
Brazilian expatriate sportspeople in Croatia
Brazilian expatriate sportspeople in Egypt